HD Medicine, or Huadong Medicine Co., Ltd., is a Hangzhou-based pharmaceutical company registered on the Shenzhen Stock Exchange since January 27, 2000. It has a listed share capital of 380,000,000 renminbi and a market capitalization of 126,323,040 renminbi . It is the largest pharmaceutical company in Zhejiang and the leading immunosuppressant manufacturer in China.

References

Manufacturing companies based in Hangzhou
Chinese brands
Pharmaceutical companies of China